Judith Eagle is an English children's historical mystery writer.

Biography
Judith Eagle grew up in London, the daughter of librarians. She worked as a stylist, fashion editor and features writer before completing an MA in Children’s Literature at Birkbeck University.

Writing
Her first two novels, The Secret Starling and The Pear Affair, are set in the more recent past (1970s and 1960s respectively), whereas her third novel, The Accidental Stowaway, is set in the early part of the 20th century.

Published works

References 

Living people
English children's writers
21st-century English women writers
Writers from London
Year of birth missing (living people)